NK Ponikve is a Croatian football club founded in 1945, based in Zagreb.

Interest in football in Stenjevec rose immediately after World War 2. At the current location of the club, Stenjevec residents enabled the construction of the first football field and gathered a group of youths in early June 1945.

October 25, 1953 The Constituent Assembly of NK Ponikve convened for the first time; it elected the first chairman of NK Ponikve, Jakov Horvat. Under the new name, the team played its first official match, and in the national cup competition, on March 7, 1954. The first team to play under its current name consisted of Bruno Žerjav, Ivan Podgoršek, Josip Marković, Željko Zlatić, Nikola Svetličanin, Drago Brož, Franjo Dukanović, Viktor Vuletić, Z. Milin, Anton Potočnik and Erich Štrukelj.

Currently the club is training about 300 children registered in the soccer schools are active and children 4–6 years old; this is popularly known as "Little Green".

Association football clubs established in 1945
Football clubs in Croatia
Football clubs in Zagreb
1945 establishments in Croatia